Project 3 Records was a record label founded in 1966 by Enoch Light, featuring LPs of pop and jazz performances employing high quality stereo recording techniques, marketed at premium prices.

Origins 
American musician, bandleader, and recording engineer Enoch Light founded Project 3 Records in August 1966. It was a joint undertaking with sewing machine manufacturer The Singer Company. Singer had entered the home entertainment and music business several years earlier as part of its diversification process, with a line of battery-operated phonographs. In 1963 Singer had also acquired KLH Research and Development Corporation, manufacturer of KLH loudspeakers, and stereo and radio products.

Project 3 was Light's industry move after having headed up Command Records at ABC-Paramount Records for six years. He founded the Command label in 1959, sold it to ABC in October that year, and ran the label as an autonomous division until his departure in 1965. The new label was targeted to release recordings in the Command vein, employing quality stereo recording techniques, marketed at a premium price. Albums were released in three formats, as phonograph records, reel-to-reel pre-recorded tapes, and 8-track tapes.

Artists
Project 3 artists, some of whom had recorded for Light on Command, included Tony Mottola, Bobby Hackett, Buddy Greco, Stan Freeman, and Peter Matz, in addition to Enoch Light and the Light Brigade.

In 1973, with the imprimatur of Popular Science magazine, Project 3 released a test record to set up and calibrate 4-channel quadraphonic sound.

A year later, the label released a quadraphonic test record produced for Fisher Electronics. The liner notes described the unique test disk:

This is a most unusual recording. Side 1 is produced via the CD-4 discrete 4 channel system and Side 2 is encoded and produced through the SQ matrix system. We believe that as of this date it is the only recording in the world which has been produced under these conditions and we do hope that it will prove to be entertaining as well as helpful in setting up your equipment and in demonstrating the different methods of 4 channel production.

Sale
Light continued to direct Project 3 until his death in August 1978. The label was acquired by record industry executive Herb Linsky in June 1979.

In 1980, Linsky entered into licensing arrangements to release sessions by Larry Elgart and his Orchestra, Louis Armstrong, and Paul Whiteman. He also signed a deal for national distribution of Project 3 recordings by Arista Records.

In July 1982, Linsky launched Project 3's midline label, Seagull Records.

In September 1991, Linsky sold Project 3 to Essex Entertainment, a New Jersey-based company engaged in music licensing and allied activities.

Select Albums

Source:

References

American_record_labels
Companies with year of disestablishment missing